The electric locomotives of Bavarian Class EP 2 were in light passenger train service in Germany for almost 50 years. After their initial classification as EP 2 by the Royal Bavarian State Railways (Königlich Bayerische Staats-Eisenbahnen), they were redesignated as E 32s from 1927 to 1968 in the DRG's numbering plan and, later in the DB classification scheme. In their final years, post-1968, they were given the EDV-compatible classification of 132. Characteristic of the E 32 was its short length and link drive (Stangenantrieb).

History 

The Bavarian Group Administration of the Deutsche Reichsbahn procured 29 E 32 electric locomotives between 1924 and 1926-29 for light passenger train duties. To begin with they still carried their Bavarian classification of EP2 20 006 to 034, before they were allocated to DRG Class E 32. Numbers 01 to 05 were unused, because they had already been allocated to the Bavarian EP 1 (later DRG Class E 62). The E 32s were employed on all the Upper Bavarian lines. In 1932 the top speed on eight of the engines was raised from 75 to 90 km/h after they had been given new gear transmissions. These eight machines were then given the numbers E 32 101 to 108 (E32.1).

Deutsche Bundesbahn 
24 engines were taken over by the Deutsche Bundesbahn after the Second World War, five had had to be written off as war losses. In 1968 22 machines were renumbered ito the EDP system as Class 132. Their service ended on 1 August 1972, when the last eight 132s were retired.

Museum 
E 32 27 has been preserved. It is housed in the Bochum-Dahlhausen Railway Museum as a non-operational exhibit.

See also 
 Royal Bavarian State Railways
List of DB locomotives and railbuses
List of DRG locomotives and railbuses
List of Bavarian locomotives and railbuses

References

External links 
 Description of the Class E 32 (German)

EP 2
Standard gauge locomotives of Germany
Brown, Boveri & Cie locomotives
Maffei locomotives
Railway locomotives introduced in 1924
15 kV AC locomotives
Passenger locomotives